The Kine Saga is a heroic fantasy trilogy written by British author A. R. Lloyd (Alan Richard Lloyd). It comprises Kine (also published as Marshworld), Witchwood and Dragon Pond (first published as Dragonpond), and chronicles the life of a wild least weasel named Kine. The name "Kine" comes from an Old English word for the weasel.

Publication

The first novel, titled simply Kine, was originally published in October 1982 by Hamlyn. It was republished by Arrow in 1990 as Marshworld. The sequel, Witchwood, first published by Muller in August 1989, was also republished by Arrow in 1990; the third book, Dragon Pond, followed from Muller in August 1990. In 2005, Marshworld was once again republished, this time under the original title, Kine, by Ulverscroft.

Plot summary

Marshworld

The young least weasel Kine lives alone at the place of his birth, beneath the roots of an old fallen willow dubbed the Life Tree. A very proud, boastful creature, he has few acquaintances: Watchman, the cynical old rook; Scrat, the shrew who is more nuisance than friend; and Kia, the bright young female weasel who seeks Kine's companionship.

Adamant that weasels are meant to lead solitary lives, Kine spurns her affections, but soon comes to respect her when she rescues him from an owl, at risk to her own life. The two weasels become inseparable, creating a den beneath the Life Tree and parenting five kits. Content with this idyllic lifestyle, Kine is unaware of the brutal mink Gru and her followers intent on invading the forest.

Witchwood

In the year following the Mink Wars, Kine has resumed a solitary life by the Moon Pond. Since Kia's death he has refused to seek another mate. Vicious rats invade the forest, and Scrat's great-grandson (Scrat) seeks Kine's help to defeat them.

Dragon Pond

Another year has passed since the fight against Rattun, and Kine is growing old. His reputation in the forest is dwindling, and even Flit and Farthing consider him to be old news.

Characters

Kine and his friends and allies

Weasels
Kine The titular character, Kine is a proud, aggressive young weasel. Known as an impetuous braggart, he has few friends until fiery Kia wins his love.

Kia A red-furred female weasel, and the great love of Kine's life. With a fiery spirit but gentle nature, Kia is highly popular in the forests and hills, and even Watchman admits to a fondness for her. She appears in Marshworld, and her spirit appears in the land of lost dreams in Witchwood.

One-Eye Kine's father. One-Eye is among the weasels who gather from the surrounding countryside to avenge Kia's death. While Kine leads the younger weasels in a sneak attack on the mink fortress, One-Eye discovers a newly released weasel, whom he discovers to be Kine's sole-surviving daughter, and names her "Wonder." One-Eye is killed by Gru in the final attack upon the pump-house, and so appears only in the first volume.

Wonder A female weasel. Kine and Kia's only surviving daughter, Wonder bears a strong resemblance to her mother. When Kia and the other kits were killed by the mink, only Wonder escaped into the forest. There she was found by the aging Poacher, who raised her by hand and later sets her free. She soon meets One-Eye, who recognizes her as Kine's daughter due to her similarity to Kia. Upon learning about her past, One-Eye gives her the name "Wonder" and reunites her with her father, Kine. Cheerful and naive at first, Wonder bravely helps the other weasels defeat Gru, and then returns to Heath's territory as his mate.

In Witchwood, Wonder and Heath once again fight beside Kine against the Rat King, this time with the help of their five unnamed kits. By the time she is sent for in Dragon Pond, Wonder has grown into a graceful and powerful fighter. Together with her father and his allies, Wonder helps rid the forest of Hob.

Wonder appears in all three books.

Heath A robust young male weasel who joins Kine and the others in the Mink Wars. He later becomes Wonder's mate. Heath joins Kine in battling both Rattun and, later, Hob. He appears in all three books.

Ford A large, strong male weasel who enters Kine's territory in hopes of winning Kia as a mate. He returns with One-Eye and the other local weasels to fight the mink alongside Kine. Brash, courageous, and good-humored, he proves a valuable ally to Kine in the final assault on the mink fortress. Ford appears only in Marshworld.

Chuk-Chukra A female weasel from the plains many miles away from Kine's home. She is the first creature Kine encounters after escaping from the truck, and the female weasel is immediately flirtatious towards him. While she tries to convince him to remain on the plains with her, Chukra quickly sees Kine's devotion to his home and Kia's memory, and decides to help him find his way home.

Through the course of the journey, Chukra shows herself to be brave and intelligent, and Kine, likening her spirit to that of Kia's, finds himself enamored with her. Chukra makes up her mind to live at the Moon Pond as Kine's mate, but is tragically killed by electrocution on a railway less than halfway through the journey, leaving the heartbroken Kine to travel on alone. Her spirit later appears to him along with Kia's, encouraging him to continue. Chukra appears in Witchwood only.

Clary A female weasel from an apple orchard not far from Kine's territory. Having heard stories of Kine's battles against Gru and Rattun, she comes to his territory seeking him as a mate. After winning him over through her flattery and sheer charisma, Clary tells Kine she will only live in the Life Tree if he slays the Pond Dragon. When the eel is killed in the night by Hob, Clary, believing Kine to be the eel's killer, moves into the Life Tree and bears four kits. At length Kine reveals that he hadn't killed the eel, and although annoyed, Clary quickly forgives him.

When Kine learns of the Alliance between Hob, Mag, and Athene, he sends Clary and the kits back to safety the orchard. Reaching the orchard, Clary sends her friends Brat, Scoter, and Bald-ear to Kine's aid, and later comes alone to join them in the fight against Hob. In the end she returns to the orchard for the winter, promising to reunite with Kine in the following summer. Clary appears only in Dragon Pond.

Growler One of Kine and Clary's sons. He is killed by Athene to spite Kine. He appears only in Dragon Pond.

Brat A brawny young male weasel from the orchard. Having grown up with Clary, he has a deep concern for her well-being. It is at Clary's request that he leads Bald-ear and Scoter to Kine's territory to fight against Hob, Mag, and Athene. When the Alliance has been defeated, he returns to his home in the orchard. Brat appears only in Dragon Pond.

Scoter A smokey-brown male weasel from the orchard, and one of Clary's many suitors. He is described by Brat as being very clever. He joins Brat and Bald-ear in coming to Kine's aid, but is killed by Mag while defending the Life Tree. He appears only in Dragon Pond.

Bald-ear A male weasel from the orchard. Missing fur around one ear from a battle scar. While strong and determined, he is not regarded as being particularly smart. Nevertheless, along with Brat and Scoter, he comes to help Kine fight the Alliance. In the end, he returns to the orchard with Brat. Bald-ear appears only in Dragon Pond.

Birds
Watchman A very old rook. Cynical and abrasive, Watchman serves as the sentinel for the local rook colony, alerting them of danger. Though he professes to dislike Kine and his ilk, he helps them repeatedly, and even admits to having a soft spot for Kia. Watchman appears in all three books.

Flit-Cat, Peck, and Farthingfeather A trio of house sparrows. Initially mocking towards Kine, after Peck is murdered by Rattun's followers, Flit and Farthing devote themselves to helping the weasel rid the Witchwood of the rats. The sparrows are extremely fond of fighting, as well as watching other creatures fight, and are always on the lookout for another "dust-up" to egg on. They appear in Witchwood and Dragon Pond.

Other animals
Old Scrat A male common shrew. A neurotic little creature prone to a pessimistic outlook. Though regarded as an annoyance by most of the animals, Kine finds a use for him as a spy against the mink. Old Scrat appears only in Marshworld, having died of old age before the beginning of the second book.

Scrat II Old Scrat's grandson. He has a deep admiration for Kine, having grown up hearing stories about the Mink War. In spite of his inherited cowardice, he plays a vital role in tricking Rattun into believing Kine has died. Scrat II appears only in Witchwood.

Scrat III Grandson of Scrat II. Like his predecessors, Scrat III serves as a worthy, if not timid, spy for Kine. He appears only in Dragon Pond.

Bunda A male marsh frog. Considered the Frog Oracle, he knows many stories about the surrounding countryside and tells Scrat about the invading mink. Shortly after, he and most of the marsh frogs are killed by Gru and her family. Bunda appears only in Marshworld.

Bufo A female common toad. Scrat presses her for information about Rattun, but upon returning a second time, he finds that she has been murdered by the rats. Bufo appears only in Witchwood.

Chessel-crumb A male hazel dormouse. The contemplative Chessel offers advice to Scrat and Kine regarding the Pond Dragon, before he himself is devoured by the eel. Chessel appears only in Dragon Pond.

Antagonists

Marshworld
Gru A black-furred female American mink. Descended from mink that escaped from fur farms, Gru and her kind seek revenge against the humans, and so travel the countryside massacring wildlife and livestock alike. Taking up residence under a nearby pump-house, Gru sets about taking over the marshland. In anticipation of meeting Kine's resistance, Gru heads an attack on the Life Tree, murdering Kia and four of her kits. In the final assault on the pump-house by Kine and the weasels, Gru is thrown into the dyke and crushed by the pump.

Liverskin A brown-furred male American mink. Gru's brown-furred mate. Not quite as cunning as Gru, but just as vicious. Liverskin is killed by Kine, Heath, and Wonder.

Witchwood
Rattun the Rat King An enormous male brown rat. Due to overexposure to Warfarin in small doses, Rattun and his colony have developed a tolerance to the poison, effectively creating a race of "Super Rats." Setting his sights on the Witchwood and surrounding territory, Rattun invades and defiles the Life Tree, infuriating Kine.

The Sow Queen Rattun's mate, a huge female brown rat intended to bear his offspring. She retreats with the other rats after her mate's defeat. The author mistakenly calls male rats boars and females sows - the correct terms are bucks and does.

Dragon Pond
The Pond Dragon A very large European eel dwelling in the Moon Pond. The Pond Dragon terrorizes the pond-side community before being slain by Hob, for which Kine is mistakenly given credit.

Hob the Berserker A large male European polecat. Taking Mag as his mate, he rallies the ferret and Athene the owl to help him ravage the countryside. Like Gru before him, Hob takes the pump house as his den. He is immensely strong and possesses a vicious temper, and the loss of Mag drives him over the edge. In the climactic battle with Kine on the Life Tree, Hob falls into the partly frozen pond and drowns.

Mag A dusky-coloured female ferret. Once a hunting ferret belonging to Poacher, the cruel-natured Mag escaped after her owner's death and became feral. Out of spite towards the humans, she joins forces with Hob and Athene, becoming Hob's mate. After she kills Scoter, Mag is lured into a fallen tractor and killed by Kine, Brat, and Bald-ear.

Athene A female little owl. An aggressive, foul-mouthed creature, she joins Hob and Mag in terrorizing the countryside. She is extremely jealous of Mag's standing with Hob, and abandons the ferret in the fight against Kine and the weasels from the orchard. Before the attack on Hob, Athene is mobbed by Watchman and the sparrows and flees for the hills.

Humans
Poacher A cantankerous old hunter who lives alone in small house. The girl works as an aid for him, bringing him food and doing chores around the home. Poacher is highly superstitious, but knowledgeable about the forest, and imparts much of his insight unto the girl. He finds the young weasel kit Wonder after the mink attack and raises her in his home, later setting her free in the woods.

Poacher dies while hunting, and the girl and her father find his body in the forest. He appears only in Marshworld.

The Old Ploughman

The Young Ploughman

The Girl

The Child The son of the girl and the young Ploughman. He is fascinated by the forest and excited by any glimpse of the weasels. He appears as an infant in Witchwood and as a toddler in Dragon Pond. In Witchwood, his catchphrase is "Glub."

The Witch

Blood fury
In Marshworld, Kine sometimes gets blood fury when faces or is angry with a villain. This may be a mental condition. It causes Kine attack any animal near to him, regardless of being friend or foe. This condition is very similar to Bloodwrath (From the Redwall Series.)

References

Fantasy novel series
1982 novels
1989 novels
1990 novels
Heroic fantasy